Pyrenecosa pyrenaea is a wolf spider species found in France.

References

External links 

Lycosidae
Spiders of Europe
Spiders described in 1876